The Baptist Church in Kyrgyzstan is one of the oldest and most widespread Protestant Christian denominations in the country. However recent years have seen a steep decline in membership (3,000 in 2010 compared to 13,000 in 1987). Only about 20% of the members are ethnic Kyrgyz, with the vast majority of the remainder drawn from Russian, German and Korean communities. Heinrich Foth, an ethnic German, is the president of Kyrgyzstan's Baptist Union.

References

Protestantism in Kyrgyzstan
Baptist denominations in Asia